Wicklow Street is an established shopping street located in Dublin city centre, running from Grafton Street in the east to Exchequer Street and South William Street in the west.

History
In 1776, the street was part of Exchequer Street, named after the old Exchequer which was sited there, having formerly been known from 1728 as Chequer Lane. At this time, Exchequer Street ran from Georges Street onto Grafton Street and the eastern end of the street did not become Wicklow Street until October 1837. The residents of this part of the street petitioned the Wide Streets Commission to have the name changed because of a bad reputation which made it difficult to find respectable tenants for the properties. M'Cready could find no explanation for the choice of Wicklow as the new name.

The jewellers Weir and Sons were established at Nos. 1-3 Wicklow Street in 1869 by Thomas Weir after leaving Wests in College Green. The drapers Brown Thomas moved from Grafton Street into a property on Nos. 38-45 Wicklow Street in 1838.

Today
Since the 1980s, part of the street has been pedestrianised, and it is now one of Ireland's most expensive streets, along with Grafton Street.

See also
 Grafton Street (Dublin)

References
Citations

Sources

External links
Wicklow Street – Archiseek

Streets in Dublin (city)
Shopping districts and streets in Ireland